Hector Roy Ward OAM (9 December 1923 – 19 December 2006) was an Australian politician.

He was born in Wangaratta, Victoria, to Hector Norman Ward and Evelyn Jane Polmear. He attended Wangaratta High School and then Melbourne Teachers' College, where he received a Primary Teachers Certificate in 1946. He had interrupted his studies to serve with the Royal Australian Air Force from 1942 to 1945; he was a special wireless intelligence officer in the Northern Territory, New Guinea, Borneo and the Philippines until he was wounded in 1945. On 31 December 1949 he married Joan Mary Etherton; they had two children. He taught at a variety of primary and secondary schools and was also secretary of the Geelong branch of the Victorian Teachers' Union from 1950 to 1954, despite also being a member of the Liberal Party. He was also a sports journalist and commentator on bowls, hockey, badminton and cycling. From 1961 to 1970 he served on Mordialloc City Council, serving as mayor from 1964 to 1965. From 1965 to 1969 he was president of the Mentone branch of the Liberal Party. He was elected to the Victorian Legislative Council in 1970 and served as government whip from 1979 to 1982 and opposition whip from 1982 to his retirement in 1988. He remained active in both Liberal and badminton circles throughout the 1990s. Ward died in 2006.

References

1923 births
2006 deaths
Liberal Party of Australia members of the Parliament of Victoria
Members of the Victorian Legislative Council
People from Wangaratta
Recipients of the Australian Sports Medal
Recipients of the Centenary Medal
Recipients of the Medal of the Order of Australia
Royal Australian Air Force personnel of World War II
20th-century Australian politicians
Sport Australia Hall of Fame inductees